The 2015–16 Polska Hokej Liga season was the 81st season of the Polska Hokej Liga, the top level of ice hockey in Poland. Twelve teams participated in the league. GKS Katowice (ice hockey) did not return to the league, as they suspended operations due to financial constraints. Three teams joined the league from the Polish 1. Liga: Nesta Mires Toruń, KH Zagłębie Sosnowiec, and SMS I Sosnowiec (a youth team). 

The regular season format remained the same as the previous season, but with 12 teams rather than only 10. The First Round had teams playing 22 matches, after which KS Cracovia led the league with 54 points. 

The league was then divided into two groups for the Second round: Group A, consisting of the top 6 teams, and Group B, consisting of the bottom 6 teams. KS Cracovia stayed in first place, finishing the season with 101 points. Their success continued into the playoffs, which they ended up winning after beating GKS Tychy in the finals. Podhale Nowy Targ won the bronze-medal match.

KH Zagłębie Sosnowiec and Naprzód Janów were relegated to the Polish 1. Liga.

Teams

Regular season (first round) 

After 22 matches, the top 6 teams advanced to the stronger group (Group A) to determine standings before playoffs.The bottom 6 teams advanced to the weaker group (Group B) to determine the two teams that would also advance to the playoffs, and the team that would be relegated.

Regular season (second round, Group A) 

The top 6 teams from the First Round were put in this group to determine the standings before the playoffs. Results from the Second Round are added to results from the First Round.

Regular season (second round, Group B) 

The bottom 6 teams from the First Round were put in this group to determine the standings before the playoffs. Results from the Second Round are added to results from the First Round.
The top two teams advanced to the Playoffs. The remaining teams, excluding SMS I Sosnowiec, were moved to the relegation round. SMS I Sosnowiec, an under-20 team, is not eligible to be relegated.

Relegation round 

The top two teams remain in the PHL, while the last place team is relegated to the Polish 1. Liga.

Playoffs

External links 
 Polish Ice Hockey Federation
 PHL

Polska Hokej Liga seasons
Polska
Polska